Alma littera is a Lithuanian publishing house, established on November 16, 1990. It mostly publishes educational books and fiction literature. Current Alma littera managing director is Dovilė Zaidė. Knyguklubas.lt is the Alma littera's e-version of the library, opened in 2003.

Alma Littera's catalogue includes several best-selling franchises and authors: Harry Potter by J.K. Rowling, several books by Madonna, The Lord of the Rings by J.R.R. Tolkien, Captain Underpants by Dav Pilkey.

Acquisitions 
In 2002, it merged with another publishing house – Šviesa and became the largest publishing house company group in the Baltic States.

In January 2022, Alma littera sold Šviesa, the group's educational division, to the investment company Žabolis ir partneriai. 

On September 9, Alma littera was acquired by BaltCap, the largest private-equity fund in the Baltic States.

References

External links
 Official Alma littera website
 Knyguklubas.lt (virtual library) 

1990 establishments in Lithuania
Publishing companies established in 1990
Book publishing companies of Lithuania
Private equity portfolio companies